Derek Preston (born 12 January 1936) is a former English cricketer. Derek Preston was a right-handed batsman who bowled slow left-arm orthodox. He was born at Leyton, Essex.

Derek Preston made his first-class debut for Sussex against Worcestershire at the County Ground, Hove, in the 1959 County Championship. He made eleven further first-class appearances for the county in that season, the last of which came against Derbyshire at Manor Sports Ground, Worthing. In his twelve matches for Sussex, he scored 154 runs at an average of 11.84, with a high score of 54. This score was his only half century and came against Nottinghamshire at Trent Bridge. With the ball, he took 13 wickets at a bowling average of 43.23, with best figures of 3/45.

References

External links
Derek Preston at ESPNcricinfo
Derek Preston at CricketArchive

1936 births
Living people
People from Leyton
English cricketers
Sussex cricketers